The Fashion Institute of Design & Merchandising (FIDM) is a private college in downtown Los Angeles. It offers degree programs in majors including fashion, entertainment, beauty, interior design, and graphic design. The college was founded in 1969 by Tonian Hohberg, the institute's president and CEO.

Academics
The college offers 26 associate of arts degree programs; a Bachelor of Science degree in business management, which is also available via distance learning; and nine Bachelor of Arts degree programs. The college also offers a master in business administration degree.

The college is accredited by the WASC Senior College and University Commission. Due to a commission review finding problems in sustainability and faculty oversight in 2019, status has changed from "Accredited" to "Accredited with Notice of Concern". It is also an accredited institutional member of the National Association of Schools of Art and Design (NASAD).

Campuses 
The college has one campus in  Los Angeles. The campus features the modern architecture of Clive Wilkinson.

FIDM's main campus in Los Angeles features innovative study spaces, a design studio, and the FIDM Museum and Galleries. The San Francisco campus is located in Union Square. The award-winning Orange County campus is a visual experience with lofts, an indoor/outdoor student lounge, bright colors, and a unique audiovisual igloo. Students can take their first year of classes at the Orange County and San Francisco campuses, but have to transfer to the Los Angeles campus for their second year.

In popular culture
FIDM served as the location of Lifetime's Project Runway season six, Project Runway: Under the Gunn, Project Runway: Threads, and Project Runway: Junior. Several FIDM alumni, including Santino Rice, Daniel Franco, Guadalupe Vidal, Kelli Martin, and Leann Marshall, were contestants on the original Project Runway show. FIDM was also featured in the MTV show The Hills, which shows the life of upcoming fashion designer, Lauren Conrad, who comes from Laguna Beach and wants to become famous for her designs.

FIDM Museum
The Fashion Institute of Design & Merchandising Museum, located at the Los Angeles Campus, is home to a large collection of fashion and costume pieces from the 1800s to today. The museum features permanent and temporary exhibits, including costumes and designs from early 20th-century Hollywood, theater, and current television shows and films. Currently, the art of costume design in television is being displayed until the start of November of 2022. The FIDM Museum Permanent Collection features more than 15,000 objects representing over 200 years of fashion, spanning haute couture, ready-to-wear, international ensembles, film costumes, and fragrance. Highlights of the collection include the Lilli Ann, Michael Arnaud, Damask Cecil Beaton, Nancy Dinsmore, Rudi Gernreich, Stella Hanania, Helen Larson, Tina Leser, Maurice Levin, and Gianni Versace Menswear archives.

Due to COVID-19 concerns, the FIDM Museum Los Angeles and Orange County galleries are now closed. It is possible to browse the FIDM online collections.

Notable people

Alumni
 Rajwa Al Saif, Saudi designer and the fiancée of Hussein, Crown Prince of Jordan
 Marina Toybina, costume designer
 Lubov Azria, fashion designer
 Katie Bender, filmmaker
 Gessica Brooke, fashion and accessories designer
 Amanda Bynes, fashion designer, actress
 Lauren Conrad, author and fashion designer
 Cris Crotz, Miss Nevada 2010
 Candice Cuoco, fashion designer, Project Runway 14 finalist
 Kyra Davis, novelist
 Lil Debbie, rapper, model, and fashion designer
 Nikita Dragun, Beauty YouTuber
 Mario Hollands, pitcher for the Philadelphia Phillies
 Sassa Jimenez, fashion designer, Philippines
 Karen Kane, fashion designer
 Lisa Kristine, fine art photographer
 Michael Kuluva, fashion designer, professional figure skater, owner of Tumbler and Tipsy
 Masiela Lusha, Albanian-American actress, poet, and humanitarian
 Leanne Marshall, fashion designer, Project Runway 5 winner
 Thai Nguyen, fashion designer and television personality 
Trish Summerville, costume designer
 Santino Rice, fashion designer, Project Runway 2 finalist
 Yotam Solomon, fashion designer
 Marlene Stewart, costume designer
 Edwin Bodney, poet
 Gottmik, drag performer, make-up artist

Faculty and staff
 Kevin Reagan, graphic designer and author
Bradford Shellhammer, entrepreneur and designer, founding editor of Queerty
 Nick Verreos, fashion designer

References

External links 
 
 FIDM Museum and galleries

Fashion schools in the United States
Business schools in California
For-profit universities and colleges in the United States
Universities and colleges in Los Angeles
Universities and colleges in Orange County, California
Universities and colleges in San Diego
Universities and colleges in San Francisco
Schools accredited by the Western Association of Schools and Colleges
California people in fashion
Private universities and colleges in California